Chauncey Alexander Hollis Jr. (born May 21, 1987), better known by his stage name Hit-Boy, is an American record producer, rapper, singer, and songwriter. In May 2011, he signed a two-year deal with Kanye West's GOOD Music production branch. With this stimulus, he produced singles such as "Niggas in Paris" by Jay-Z and Kanye West, "Trophies" by Drake, "Clique" by GOOD Music, and "Racks in the Middle" by Nipsey Hussle featuring Roddy Ricch. "Racks in the Middle" won Best Rap Performance at the 2020 Grammy Awards.

In December 2012, Hit-Boy signed a recording contract with Interscope Records and subsequently founded his own record label imprint, Hits Since '87. He has since expanded his production catalog with singles such as "Drop the World" by Lil Wayne, "Sorry" by Beyoncé, and "Sicko Mode" by Travis Scott, all of which have been certified platinum or higher by the Recording Industry Association of America (RIAA).

Career
Hollis got his start on Myspace when he received a message from Polow Da Don stating simply "Let's get this paper, pimp", and reached out to say he wanted to meet Hollis and discuss signing him professionally. He has produced for big-name artists such as Big Sean, Kid Cudi, Kanye West, Jay-Z, Beyoncé, Lil Wayne, Eminem, 50 Cent, Mary J. Blige, Nas, Chris Brown, Snoop Dogg, Justin Bieber, Drake, Kendrick Lamar, Selena Gomez and several others. The California native is one of the founding members of the collective brand Surf Club (along with fellow beat makers Chase N.Cashe, BCarr, and Chili Chill). Surf Club has become a team to host a number of artists as well as songwriters and other producers. Surf Club originated in southern California. They got their start in the industry in 2007, after linking with Polow Da Don's Zone 4, an imprint of Interscope Records. He began his work with Kanye West when he produced his GOOD Friday track, "Christmas in Harlem", Big Sean, Pusha T, Musiq Soulchild and Cyhi Da Prynce. On May 2, 2011, he signed to Kanye West's GOOD Music Label, produced the single "Niggas in Paris", on the collaborative "Watch the Throne" album created by Kanye West and Jay-Z, and produced the singles "Goldie" and "1 Train" for ASAP Rocky.

On June 7, 2012, Hollis released his first official song in which he raps, the promotional single "Jay-Z Interview", which was produced by Bink!. Later in July 2012, Hollis was featured rapping on CyHi The Prynce's mixtape Ivy League Club, on the song "Entourage". Hollis then released the self-produced track "Old School Caddy", which features fellow GOOD Music member Kid Cudi. These two tracks appeared on his first full-length project, a mixtape titled HITstory, which was released for free download on his official website. On December 23, 2012, Hollis secured a recording contract with Interscope Records, under the record label Blueprint Group, along with the L.E.P. Bogus Boys. Soon after, he tweeted: "2012 has been great to me and my fam. Feeling more blessed than ever. Excited to see what God has planned for 2013. TU." On January 23, 2013, it was announced that his record label Hits Since '87, is now an imprint of Interscope Records.

On June 29, 2013, he announced that he is no longer signed to GOOD Music, but still on good terms with everybody in the label.

In 2016, Hit-Boy and Local Los Angeles rapper Dom Kennedy came together to work on a joint mixtape named Half-A-Mil EP, subsequently adopting the name (dropping the EP) as an alias for the duo. Half-A-Mil EP was released on December 11, 2016. The mixtape consisted of five songs, with "100 Rounds" being the lead single off the mixtape. Following the release of their first mixtape, the pair decided to put out another mixtape a few months after their previous mixtape. Half-A-Mil 2 EP released on February 24, 2017. The mixtape contained six songs with one guest feature from B.Carr. The duo would take a break and would not release music under the Half-A-Mil name. After some time, the frequent collaborators released Half-A-Mil 3 EP, continuing the mixtape series and being the last one in the saga. Half-A-Mil 3 EP was August 8, 2017. The mixtape only had two feature from 24hrs on "Don't run" and Quentin Miller on the tracks "Might as Well" and "In The Hills". Also, the duo released a music video for both songs on September 7, 2017. After releasing all three mixtapes, the pair finally released their first commercial album, Courtesy of Half-a-Mil, on November 29, 2017. The album contains 14 tracks and numerous features such as Larry June, TYuS, B.Carr, Jay 305, and Ty Dolla Sign. The Tandem would go on to take a hiatus and not release any new music. Nearly two and half years later, the group would release their second studio. "Also Known As" was released on July 31, 2020. The album consists of 11 tracks and features from 03 Greedo, 24hrs, and Nas.

From 2020 to 2022, Hit-Boy teamed up with Nas to executively produce the King's Disease series, King's Disease, King's Disease 2, and most recently King's Disease III to close out 2022. King's Disease 1 and 2 were consecutively nominated for Grammy Award for Best Rap Album of the Year, with King's Disease winning and awarding Nas with the legendary rapper's first Grammy award throughout his storied career. They also collaborated on Nas's fifteenth studio album, Magic, before following up with the third installment of the King's Disease series, King's Disease III.

Production style
Hit-Boy uses FL Studio and custom music plug-ins to make his beats.

Personal life
Hit-Boy is the nephew of Rodney Benford, from the R&B group Troop. He grew up in Fontana, California.

Discography

Studio albums

EPs

Mixtapes

Guest appearances and production credit

Awards and nominations

Publication awards and nominations

Grammy Awards
The Grammy Awards is an award presented by The Recording Academy to recognize achievement in the mainly English-language music industry. Hit-Boy received four Grammy awards from twelve nominations.

References

External links
 Official website
 Hit-Boy discography
 Complete Surf Club discography

1987 births
Living people
African-American male rappers
African-American record producers
American hip hop record producers
American rhythm and blues keyboardists
Grammy Award winners for rap music
People from Fontana, California
Rappers from California
Songwriters from California
West Coast hip hop musicians
21st-century American rappers
Record producers from California
21st-century American male musicians
African-American songwriters
21st-century African-American musicians
20th-century African-American people
American male songwriters
FL Studio users